This article details the complete works of American musician Pall Jenkins.

Discography

Three Mile Pilot

Studio albums

Extended plays

Compilation albums

The Black Heart Procession

Studio albums

Extended plays

Compilation albums

Ugly Casanova

Mr. Tube and The Flying Objects

Credits

References

External links
Pall Jenkins at Discogs

Discographies of American artists
Rock music discographies